Lee Sang-ho (born 9 May 1987) is a South Korean football winger who most recently played for FC Seoul.

Club career
Lee start his club career at Ulsan Hyundai in 2006.

On 13 February 2009, Lee moved to the Suwon Samsung.

On 26 January 2012, Lee moved to the UAE Pro-League side Al Sharjah on a loan deal until lasting May 31.

On 28 December 2016, Lee moved to the FC Seoul.

International career 
Lee played at the 2007 U-20 World cup. He made his first senior match against Iraq on 28 March 2009.

Club career statistics

Personal life
His brother Lee Sang-don is also a footballer.

References

External links
 
 Lee Sang-ho – National Team stats at KFA 
 
 

1987 births
Living people
Sportspeople from Ulsan
South Korean footballers
South Korea under-20 international footballers
South Korea under-23 international footballers
South Korea international footballers
South Korean expatriate footballers
Association football wingers
Ulsan Hyundai FC players
Suwon Samsung Bluewings players
FC Seoul players
Sharjah FC players
Gimcheon Sangmu FC players
K League 1 players
K League 2 players
Expatriate footballers in the United Arab Emirates
South Korean expatriate sportspeople in the United Arab Emirates
UAE Pro League players